Sonchus palmenis, the La Palma sow-thistle, is a plant endemic to the Canary Island of La Palma.

Description
Tall shrub up to 2 m. Leaves pinnatisect with 10-15 pairs of equally spaced lobes, the lobes 6–40 mm wide. Inflorescence very large and dense, compound-corymbose. Individual heads with 30-50 yellow ray florets but no disc florets.

Distribution in La Palma
Widespread especially along the east coast, Fuencaliente, Mazo, Santa Cruz, Las Breñas, Puntallana, La Galga, Los Tilos, etc. west coast, Los Llanos, etc., up to 1000 m in the lower and forest zones.

Gallery

References

 David Bramwell and Zoë Bramwell. Wild Flowers of the Canary Islands. Editorial Rueda, Madrid, España. 2001.

External links
 Flora de Canarias
 Flickr photo
 Calphotos photo gallery, University of California

palmensis
Endemic flora of the Canary Islands